Dugongidae is a family in the order of Sirenia. The family has one surviving species, the dugong (Dugong dugon),  one recently extinct species, Steller's sea cow (Hydrodamalis gigas), and a number of extinct genera known from fossil records.
 Dugongidae's body weight ranges from 217 to 307 kg for juveniles, 334 to 424 kg for subadults, and 435 to 568.5 kg for adults. Oral temperatures for individual dugongs is determined from 24° to 34.2 °C. Heart rate readings are from 40 to 96 bpm and vary between individual dugongs. Respiration rate during the out-of-water phase is from 1 to 33.

Taxonomy
 Family DUGONGIDAE
 Genus †Anisosiren
 Genus †Caribosiren
 Genus †Indosiren
 Genus †Lentiarenium
 Genus †Kaupitherium
 Genus †Paralitherium
 Genus †Priscosiren
 Genus †Prohalicore
 Genus †Sirenavus
 Subfamily †Halitheriinae
 Genus †Halitherium (nomen dubium)
 Subfamily Dugonginae
 Genus †Bharatisiren
 Genus †Callistosiren
 Genus †Crenatosiren
 Genus †Corystosiren
 Genus †Culebratherium
 Genus †Dioplotherium
 Genus †Domningia
 Genus Dugong
 Species Dugong dugon, dugong
 Genus †Italosiren
 Genus †Kutchisiren
 Genus †Nanosiren
 Genus †Norosiren
 Genus †Rytiodus
 Genus †Xenosiren
 Subfamily †Metaxytheriinae
 Genus †Metaxytherium
 Subfamily †Hydrodamalinae
 Genus †Dusisiren
 Genus †Hydrodamalis
 Species †Hydrodamalis cuestae
 Species †Hydrodamalis spissa
 Species †Hydrodamalis gigas, Steller's sea cow

The genera Eosiren, Eotheroides, and Prototherium have been assigned to Halitheriinae in the past, but recent cladistic analysis recovers these genera as basal to the clade formed by Trichechidae and Dugongidae. Moreover, Halitheriinae is paraphyletic with respect to Dugonginae and Hydrodamalinae, and further use of the name should be discontinued because the type genus is based on a non-diagnostic tooth.

Phylogeny

References

Sirenians
Mammal families
Taxa named by John Edward Gray